The Salem Nuclear Power Plant is a two unit pressurized water reactor nuclear power plant located in Lower Alloways Creek Township, in Salem County, New Jersey, in the United States.  It is owned by PSEG Nuclear LLC and Constellation Energy.

Location
Salem shares an artificial Island in the Delaware Bay with the Hope Creek Nuclear Power Plant.

Reactors
The reactors, both PWRs, were built by Westinghouse, and began commercial operation in 1977 (Unit 1) and 1981 (Unit 2).  The two-unit plant has a capacity of 2,275 MWe. In 2009, PSEG applied for 20-year license renewals for both units, which were approved by the NRC in 2011.
Unit 1 is now licensed to operate until August 13, 2036 and Unit 2 is licensed to operate until April 18, 2040.

Electricity Production

Surrounding population

The 2010 U.S. population within  of Salem was 52,091, an increase of 54.1 percent in a decade, according to an analysis of U.S. Census data for msnbc.com. The 2010 U.S. population within  was 5,482,329, an increase of 7.6 percent since 2000. Cities within 50 miles include Philadelphia (43 miles to city center).

Safety issues
The New York Times has reported that in the 1990s the Salem reactors were shut down for two years because of maintenance problems. Consultants found several difficulties, including a leaky generator, unreliable controls on a reactor, and workers who feared that reporting problems would lead to retaliation. In 2004, the Nuclear Regulatory Commission took on additional oversight of the Salem plants and increased the monitoring of them.

An extensive investigation by the Nuclear Regulatory Commission, and the subsequent review by hired consultants have found many minor problems, such as lack of routine maintenance and low morale among personnel, but declared the plant safe.

On August 22, 2013, the Salem nuclear plant was shut down after a leak of slightly radioactive water. The spill was confined to the plant's containment building, and regulators have said there is no risk to the public.  The plant restarted on  August 24, after having been shut down for less than 48 hours.

In May 2014 a scheduled refueling outage of Salem 2 was extended after broken bolts from a cooling pump were found in the reactor vessel. Westinghouse dispatched a team to inspect the pumps. The inspection revealed bolts in the bottom of the cooling pumps as well as the bottom of the reactor vessel.  Unit 2 was returned to service on July 11, 2014.

Water use

Both reactors use Delaware Bay as a source of cooling water. Salem Units 1 and 2 have a water-intake building with a rotating screen to collect debris that is later washed off. Sometimes thick layers of grass clog the intakes and the reactors run at reduced power for weeks as a result. All of the waste heat produced in the steam cycle (about 2 gigawatts) is dumped into the bay. The resultant increase in water temperature is regulated to less than 1 °C in summer months, and to 2 °C the rest of the year. The large closed-cycle cooling tower on site is part of the neighboring Hope Creek plant and is not used by the Salem reactors.

See also

List of largest power stations in the United States

References

External links 
Official PSEG website
DoE Page

Buildings and structures in Salem County, New Jersey
Energy infrastructure completed in 1977
Energy infrastructure completed in 1981
Lower Alloways Creek Township, New Jersey
Nuclear power plants in New Jersey
Nuclear power stations using pressurized water reactors
Towers completed in 1977
Towers in New Jersey
Exelon
Public Service Enterprise Group
1977 establishments in New Jersey